Samea calonalis is a moth in the family Crambidae. It is found in Brazil.

Adults are brownish, tinged with cupreous or purplish. The wings have two very irregular and diffuse yellow iridescent nearly hyaline bands formed of spots and patches. This yellow area is much more prevalent on the hindwings.

References

Moths described in 1859
Spilomelinae